The hired armed lugger Royalist served the Royal Navy from 1798 to 1800 and she was armed with eight guns. She may have been built in 1798.

Royalists commander, as of 1 January 1799, was Lieutenant Jackson Dowsing.

Citations and references
Citations

References

 

Hired armed vessels of the Royal Navy
1790s ships